Hamand Kuhan va Kurdar (also Romanized as Hamand Kūhān va Kurdar) is a village in Jamabrud Rural District, in the Central District of Damavand County, Tehran Province, Iran. At the 2006 census, its population was 45, in 37 families.

References 

Populated places in Damavand County